The Middle English Metrical Paraphrase of the Old Testament is a retelling of the Old Testament in Middle English rhyme for lay people, dated to the early fifteenth century, c. 1400-1410. Over 18,000 verses long, it exists in two manuscripts from the middle of the fifteenth century, both written in a Northern dialect from the Yorkshire area.

Form
The poem contains 1531 stanzas of twelve lines usually rhyming ABABABABCDCD, for a total of 18,372 verses. The stanzas consist of three quatrains, the first two in tetrameter, the last in trimeter.

Manuscripts
The two manuscripts containing the Metrical Paraphrase are MS Selden supra 52 (Bodleian 3440), fols. 2a-168a (S), and MS Longleat 257, fols. 119a-212a (L), a manuscript in the private collection of the Marquess of Bath. The two manuscripts are not directly related; that is to say, they are not derived from one another, nor from a common manuscript (Kalén, p. xxxiv). Both date from 1425–75 and are, like the original, written in a Northern dialect. According to Kalén, the Midland scribe who produced L purposely adapted the language to be more easily read by non-Northern readers.

Available editions
Russell A. Peck, ed. The Middle English Metrical Paraphrase of the Old Testament (selection). In Heroic Women from the Old Testament in Middle English Verse. Kalamazoo, Michigan: Medieval Institute Publications, 1991
Herbert Kalén, ed. A Middle English Metrical Paraphrase of the Old Testament. Goteborgs Hogskolas Arsskrift 28. Goteborg: Elanders Boktryckeri Aktiebolag, 1923. (Contains the first 500 stanzas.)
Urban Ohlander, ed. A Middle English Metrical Paraphrase of the Old Testament. Vols. 2-4, plus vol. 5: Glossary. Gothenburg Studies in English 5, 11, 16, 24. Stockholm: Almqvist and Wiksell, 1955, 1960, 1963, 1972.

External links
Metrical Paraphrase (selection), ed. Russell A. Peck

15th-century poems
Middle English poems
Old Testament
Biblical paraphrases
Bible translations into English